The following is a list of notable people who were born in KwaBhaca formally known as Mount Frere in the Eastern Cape province of South Africa.

Monarchs 
 King Zwelibanzi Dalindyebo, Aa! Zwelibanzi! - King of the abaThembu in Bumbane Great Place, Mthatha
 King Zwelenkosi Matanzima, Aa! Zwelenkosi! - King of the Western Thembu in Qamata Great Place, Cofimvaba
 King Zwelozuko Matiwane, Aa! Zwelozuko! - King of the AmaMpondomise in Kroza Great Place, Qumbu
 King Nyangelizwe Ndamase, Aa! Nyangelizwe! - King of the Western Mpondo in Nyandeni Great Place, Libode
 King Zanesizwe Sandile, Aa! Zanesizwe! - King of the Rharhabe sub-group of the Xhosa nation in Mngqesha Great Place, King William's Town
 King Zwelonke Sigcawu, Aa! Zwelonke! - King of the Xhosa nation in Nqadu Great Place, Willowvale
 King Jongilizwe Sigcau, Aa! Jongilizwe! - King of the Mpondo in Qaukeni Great Place, Lusikisiki

Politicians 

 Neville Alexander
 Steve Biko
 Fort Calata
 James Calata
 Charles Coghlan
 Nosipho Dastile
 Sophia De Bruyn
 Lilian Diedericks
 Cedric Frolick
 John Gomomo
 Matthew Goniwe
 Joe Gqabi
 Oupa Gqozo
 Chris Hani
 Makhanda
 Clarence Makwetu
 Nelson Mandela
 Winnie Mandela
 George Matanzima
 Kaiser Matanzima
 Florence Matomela
 Govan Mbeki
 Thabo Mbeki
 Moeletsi Mbeki
 Epainette Mbeki
 Raymond Mhlaba, first Premier of the Eastern Cape
 Sicelo Mhlauli
 Vuyisile Mini
 Sparrow Mkhonto
 Wilton Mkwayi
 Oscar Mpetha
 Griffiths Mxenge
 Victoria Mxenge
 Natasha Ntlangwini
 Alfred Nzo
 Sabelo Phama
 Robert Resha
 Walter Rubusana
 Charles Sebe
 Lennox Sebe
 Archie Sibeko
 Letitia Sibeko
 Annie Silinga
 Walter Sisulu
 Albertina Sisulu
 Robert Sobukwe
 David Stuurman
 Oliver Tambo
 Steve Tshwete
 Moses Twebe
 Alfred Xuma

Celebrities 

 Lukhanyo Am rugby player
 Sarah Baartman
 Amanda Black
 Mark Boucher cricketer
 Busiswa
 Brenda Ngxoli actress
 Allister Coetzee
 Simphiwe Dana
 Lulu Dikana
 Zonke Dikana
 Kermit Erasmus footballer
 Rassie Erasmus rugby coach
 Allan Gray
 Lizo Gqoboka
 iFani
 Andile Jali footballer
 Akhumzi Jezile
 John Kani
 Daine Klate
 Siya Kolisi
 Wandisile Letlabika
 Cecil Lolo
 Kevin Luiters
 Ringo Madlingozi
 Mzi Mahola
 Zolani Mahola
 Nathi Mankayi
 Masibulele Makepula
 Makazole Mapimpi
 Margaret M'cingana Singana
 Asavela Mbekile
 Zenande Mfenyana
 Maxwell Mlilo
 Nambitha Mpumlwana
 S.E.K. Mqhayi
 Bongani Ndulula
 Akona Ndungane
 Odwa Ndungane
 Zim Ngqawana
 Makhaya Ntini
 Zola Nombona
 Jet Novuka
 Siphosakhe Ntiya-Ntiya
 Ntsikelelo Nyauza
 R.L. Peteni
 Tiyo Soga
 Enoch Sontonga
 Mzwandile Stick
 Vusi Thanda
 Lonwabo Tsotsobe
 Zozibini Tunzi
 Cheeky Watson
 Gavin Watson
 Luke Watson
 Ronwen Williams

Criminals 

 Bulelani Mabhayi
 Nicholas Lungisa Ncama
 Butana Almond Nofomela
 Thozamile Taki
 Bulelani Vukwana

Sports
 Xolisani "Nomeva" Ndongeni Boxer
 Mlungisi Mbunjana football player
 Lukhanyo Am rugby player

See also 
 List of Xhosa people
 List of South Africans

People from the Eastern Cape
Eastern Cape